Race Creek is a stream in western Washington County in the U.S. state of Missouri. It is a tributary to Allen Branch. 

Race Creek was named for an old mill race along its course.

See also
List of rivers of Missouri

References

Rivers of Washington County, Missouri
Rivers of Missouri